Hong Kong Parkview is the largest private housing estate in Tai Tam, Hong Kong. It is located at  88 Tai Tam Reservoir Road, Hong Kong Island, between Jardine's Lookout and Violet Hill. To its west is the Wong Nai Chung Gap. It is surrounded by Tai Tam Country Park.

Description
Its Chinese name is 陽明山莊, literally translated as "Yangming Mountain Villa". 

Its units are high-end residences. Its ground level is nearly 300 meters above sea level, making its buildings some of the highest in Hong Kong. There are 18 buildings in total. It was designed by Wang Dong Architects Co., Ltd. and constructed by Hip Hing Construction Co., Ltd. from August 1988 to May 1989.

Each block is 20 storys tall. The estate comprises a total of 984 flats.

History
It consists of 18 blocks opened in 1989 by Chyau Fwu and designed by Wong Tung & Partners. It is managed by the Parkview Group today. 

Being surrounded by protected lands on all sides, the development was criticised after opening for spoiling the serenity of Tai Tam Country Park.

In 2004, undercover officers from the Home Affairs Department stayed overnight at Hong Kong Parkview, and found that it offered services akin to that of a hotel. Parkview (Suites) Limited and Tri-view Limited were thus fined HK$20,000 for operating a hotel without a licence, as is required under the Hotel and Guesthouse Accommodation Ordinance. Parkview appealed the fines, arguing that they operated within a technical loophole, but the appeal was rejected by the Court of Final Appeal in 2006.

Education
Parkview is in Primary One Admission (POA) School Net 18. Within the school net are multiple aided schools (operated independently but funded with government money) and Hong Kong Southern District Government Primary School (香港南區官立小學).

Murder incident

On 2 November 2003, Robert Kissel, the Asia-Pacific managing director of global principal products of Merrill Lynch, was bludgeoned to death by his wife, Nancy Kissel, after having their young daughter bring him a milkshake laced with sleep medicine.

Gallery

References

External links

 

Buildings and structures completed in 1989
Private housing estates in Hong Kong
Swire Group
Tai Tam
1989 establishments in Hong Kong